Giedrius Gustas (born 4 March 1980) is a former Lithuanian professional basketball player. At the height of 1.90 m (6'2 3⁄4") tall and a weight of 86 kg (190 lbs.), he mainly played at the point guard position. During his club playing career, as a member of Žalgiris Kaunas, he won the EuroLeague championship in 1999. As a member of the Barons LMT, he won the Europe Cup championship in 2008. He was also a member of the senior Lithuanian national team, and with Lithuania, he won the gold medal at the 2003 EuroBasket and the bronze medal at the 2007 EuroBasket.

Early years and life
Giedrius Gustas graduated from the Arvydas Sabonis basketball school. He started his training being at eight with the Lithuanian basketball coach Ramūnas Šalūga. He was a member of the 1980s boys' generation, the first generation to graduate from Sabonis' basketball school. 1996 played for the Lithuanian junior basketball team. 1998 together with R. Javtokas, A. Macijauskas, D. Zavackas, G. Kadžiulis, T. Nagis, played for the Lithuanian youth basketball team. In 1998, Giedrius Gustas graduated from the Kaunas V. Kuprevičiaus (former Kaunas 32) primary school.

Professional career
Giedrius Gustas joined the Lithuanian League club Žalgiris Kaunas, in 1998. With Žalgiris, he won the NEBL championship, the EuroLeague championship, and the Lithuanian League championship in 1999. In 2008, while he was playing with the Latvian League club Barons LMT, he won the FIBA EuroCup championship, and he was also named the league's Final Four MVP. 

In 2009, Giedrius Gustas joined the Greek League club EKK Kavala.

National team career
Giedrius Gustas played with the junior national teams of Lithuania. With Lithuania's Under-18 junior national team, he played at the 1998 FIBA Europe Under-18 Championship.

Giedrius Gustas was also a member of the senior Lithuanian national team. With Lithuania, he played at the 2006 FIBA World Championship. He also played at the 2003 EuroBasket, where he won a gold medal, the 2005 EuroBasket, and the 2007 EuroBasket, where he won a bronze medal. With Lithuania, he played in 72 games and scored a total of 298 points.

Coaching and managerial career
On 31 August 2016, Giedrius Gustas announced his retirement as a player, and he became the assistant basketball coach of the Lithuanian League club Dzūkija Alytus. From 2016 to 2017, he worked as the Sports Director of Dzūkija Alytus. In 2018, Giedrius Gustas became a member of the Lithuanian Basketball Federation's board and the Director of the Lithuanian Women's League.

Personal life
In 2017, Giedrius Gustas graduated from Vytautas Magnus University with a Bachelor's degree in Business Administration and Management. Two years later, Giedrius Gustas graduated from the same institution with a Master's degree in Marketing and Sales.

Career awards and achievements
As player
 NEBL champion: 1999
 EuroLeague champion: 1999
 4× Lithuanian League champion: 1999, 2001, 2003, 2004
 Lithuanian League Runner-up: 2002
 EuroBasket : 2003
 Latvian League Runner-up: 2006
 EuroBasket : 2007
 FIBA EuroCup champion: 2008
 FIBA EuroCup Final Four MVP: 2008
 Latvian League champion: 2008
 Lithuanian League 3rd place: 2013
 Estonian League 3rd place: 2014

References

External links
Euroleague.net Profile
FIBA Archive Profile
FIBA Europe Profile
Polish League Profile 
Player Profile @ Basketnews.lt 
Draftexpress.com Profile

1980 births
Living people
2006 FIBA World Championship players
Basketball executives
Basketball players from Kaunas
BC Dynamo Moscow players
BC Dzūkija players
BC Neptūnas players
BC Rakvere Tarvas players
BC Žalgiris players
BC Žalgiris-2 players
BC Zenit Saint Petersburg players
BK Barons players
FIBA EuroBasket-winning players
Kavala B.C. players
Lithuanian basketball coaches
Lithuanian expatriate basketball people in Estonia
Lithuanian expatriate basketball people in Greece
Lithuanian expatriate basketball people in Latvia
Lithuanian expatriate basketball people in Poland
Lithuanian expatriate basketball people in Russia
Lithuanian men's basketball players
PBC Lokomotiv-Kuban players
Point guards
Shooting guards
Trefl Sopot players
Turów Zgorzelec players